Gyalideopsis is a genus of lichens in the family Gomphillaceae. The genus was circumscribed by Czech lichenologist Antonín Vězda in 1972.

Species
, Species Fungorum accepts 55 species of Gyalideopsis.
Gyalideopsis altamirensis 
Gyalideopsis americana 
Gyalideopsis applanata 
Gyalideopsis aptrootii 
Gyalideopsis arvidssonii 
Gyalideopsis bartramiorum 
Gyalideopsis berenice 
Gyalideopsis buckii 
Gyalideopsis caespitosa 
Gyalideopsis chibaensis 
Gyalideopsis chicaque 
Gyalideopsis choshuencensis 
Gyalideopsis crenulata 
Gyalideopsis cristata 
Gyalideopsis dominicana 
Gyalideopsis ellipsoidea 
Gyalideopsis epicorticis 
Gyalideopsis frahmii 
Gyalideopsis glauca 
Gyalideopsis globispora 
Gyalideopsis graminicola 
Gyalideopsis halocarpa 
Gyalideopsis heardense 
Gyalideopsis helvetica 
Gyalideopsis japonica 
Gyalideopsis laevithallina 
Gyalideopsis lambinonii 
Gyalideopsis lobulata 
Gyalideopsis lunata 
Gyalideopsis macarthurii 
Gyalideopsis marcellii 
Gyalideopsis moodyae 
Gyalideopsis muscicola 
Gyalideopsis ozarkensis 
Gyalideopsis pallescens 
Gyalideopsis pandani 
Gyalideopsis peruviana 
Gyalideopsis pseudoactinoplaca 
Gyalideopsis puertoricensis 
Gyalideopsis pusilla 
Gyalideopsis rogersii 
Gyalideopsis rubescens 
Gyalideopsis scotica 
Gyalideopsis sessilis 
Gyalideopsis subaequatoriana 
Gyalideopsis submonospora 
Gyalideopsis tuerkii 
Gyalideopsis usneicola 
Gyalideopsis vainioi 
Gyalideopsis verruculosa 
Gyalideopsis vulgaris 
Gyalideopsis wesselsii 
Gyalideopsis williamsii 
Gyalideopsis wirthii

References

Ostropales
Lichen genera
Ostropales genera
Taxa named by Antonín Vězda
Taxa described in 1972